In baseball, a single is the most common type of base hit, accomplished through the act of a batter safely reaching first base by hitting a fair ball (thus becoming a runner) and getting to first base before a fielder puts him out.  As an exception, a batter-runner reaching first base safely is not credited with a single when an infielder attempts to put out another runner on the first play; this is one type of a fielder's choice. Also, a batter-runner reaching first base on a play due to a fielder's error trying to put him out at first base or another runner out (as a fielder's choice) is not credited with a single.

On a single hit to the outfield, any runners on second base or third base normally score, and sometimes the runner from the first base can advance to third base.  Depending on the location of the hit, a quick recovery by the outfielder can prevent such an advance or create a play on the advancing runner.

Pete Rose is the all-time leader in singles with 3,215 career. Ty Cobb (3,053) is the only other player in MLB history with over 3,000 career singles.

Key

List

Stats updated as of the end of the 2022 season.

Notes

References

External links

Major League Baseball statistics
Singles leaders